John was a medieval Bishop of Rochester.

Life

John was a nephew of Ralph d'Escures Archbishop of Canterbury, who he served as a clerk. He was appointed Archdeacon of Canterbury between 27 June 1115 and 16 September 1115.

John was elected to the See of Rochester before 12 April 1125 and consecrated on 24 May 1125. He died on 20 June 1137.

Citations

References
 British History Online Archdeacons of Canterbury accessed on 30 October 2007
 British History Online Bishops of Rochester accessed on 30 October 2007

Further reading
 

Bishops of Rochester
Archdeacons of Canterbury
12th-century English Roman Catholic bishops
1137 deaths
Anglo-Normans
Year of birth unknown